John Evans may refer to:

Academics
John Evans (archaeologist) (1823–1908), English archaeologist and geologist
John Evans (topographical writer) (1768–c. 1812), writer on Wales
John Cayo Evans (1879–1958), Welsh mathematician
John Davies Evans (1925–2011), English archaeologist
John Gwenogvryn Evans (1852–1930), Welsh minister and paleographer
John Robert Evans (1929–2015), Canadian cardiologist and civic leader
John V. Evans (astronomer) (born 1933), British-American
John Wainwright Evans (1909–1999), solar astronomer 
John William Evans (geologist) (1857–1930), British
John William Evans (entomologist), British entomologist

Entertainment
John Evans (actor) (1693–1734), Irish
John Evans (19th-century writer) (died 1832), English writer
John Evans (artist) (1932–2012), American
John Evans (director), American film director and screenwriter
John Evans (special effects), on five James Bond films
John Bryan Evans (born 1980), Welsh filmmaker
John Morgan Evans (1942–1991), American actor and playwright
Jon Evans (born 1973), Canadian novelist and journalist
John Evans or I. D. Ffraid (1814–1875), Welsh poet

Sports

Association football
John Evans (footballer, born 1859) (1859–1939), Welsh footballer for Oswestry Town
John Evans (footballer, born 1900) (born 1900), English footballer for Sheffield United, Walsall, and Stoke
John Evans (footballer, born 1929) (1929–2004), English footballer for Liverpool
John Evans (footballer, born 1932) (1932–2009), English footballer
John Evans (footballer, born 1941), footballer for Chester City
John Evans (bowls) (born 1947), Torquay footballer and bowler
Jonny Evans (born 1988), Northern Irish footballer for Leicester City
Ted Evans (footballer) (John Edward Evans, 1868–1942), English footballer for Stoke and Port Vale

Cricket
John Evans (cricketer, born 1889) (1889–1960), English cricketer
John Evans (Kent cricketer) (fl. 1820s), English cricketer

Gridiron football
John C. Evans (fl. 1930–1965), American football and basketball player and coach
John Evans (American football), American football tight end
Johnny Evans (American football) (born 1956), American football player and radio commentator 
Johnny Evans (Canadian football) (died bef. 1930), Canadian football player

Rugby
Jack Evans (rugby, born 1871) (1871–1924), or John, Welsh rugby union and rugby league forward
Jack Elwyn Evans (1897–1941), or John, Welsh rugby union and rugby league wing or centre
Jack Evans (English rugby league, born 1897) (John Evans), English professional rugby league centre
John Evans (rugby union) (1911–1943), Welsh international rugby union hooker
John Hart Evans (1881–1959), Welsh rugby union centre
Jack Evans (rugby union, born 1875) (John William Evans, 1875–1947), Welsh rugby union forward

Other sports
John Evans (bowls) (born 1947), English footballer and bowls player
John Russell Evans (born 1935), Welsh lawn bowler
John Evans (canoeist) (born 1949), American slalom canoer
John Evans (Gaelic football), Irish Gaelic football manager
John Evans (Gaelic footballer, born 1955), Irish Gaelic footballer
Paul Evans (ice hockey, born 1954) (John Paul Evans), Canadian ice hockey player
John Evans (Australian footballer, born 1950), Australian footballer

Music
John Evan (born 1948), or Evans, English musician with Jethro Tull
John Evans (Box Tops) (born before 1963), American musician with the Box Tops
John Rhys Evans (1930–2010), Welsh operatic baritone

Politics
John Evans (Australian politician) (1855–1943), Australian politician in Tasmania

Canada
John Evans (British Columbia politician) (1816–1879), Canadian miner and politician in British Columbia
John Evans (Saskatchewan politician) (1867–1958), Welsh-born Canadian politician from Saskatchewan
John Leslie Evans (born 1941), Canadian politician from Ontario
John Newell Evans (1846–1944), Welsh-born Canadian politician from British Columbia

United Kingdom
John Evans (died 1565), English politician from Shrewsbury
John Evans, 5th Baron Carbery (1738–1807), Irish peer
John Evans (Ogmore MP) (1875–1961), Welsh politician from Ogmore
John Evans, Baron Evans of Parkside (1930–2016), United Kingdom politician
John Evans (Haverfordwest MP) (died 1864), MP for Haverfordwest 1847–1852
John William Evans (Welsh politician) (1870–1906), Liberal politician in Aberdare, South Wales

United States
John Evans (Colorado governor) (1814–1897), 2nd territorial governor of Colorado
John Evans (Idaho governor) (1925–2014), governor of Idaho
John Evans (Pennsylvania governor) (1678–?), governor of Pennsylvania
John Gary Evans (1863–1942), governor of South Carolina
John M. Evans (1863–1946), member of Congress from Montana
John M. Evans (Wisconsin politician) (1820–1903), American physician and politician
John Marshall Evans (born 1950), American ambassador to Armenia
John R. Evans (born 1955), American politician from Pennsylvania

Religion
John Evans (1702–1782), Welsh anti-Methodist Anglican priest
John Evans (Baptist) (1767–1827), Welsh minister
John Evans (bishop) (bef. died 1724), Welsh-born bishop of Bangor and bishop of Meath
John Evans (died 1779), Welsh Anglican priest and curate of Portsmouth
John Evans (divine) (1680–1730), Welsh divine and writer
John Evans (Methodist) (1779–1847), Welsh Methodist of Llwynffortun 
St John Evans (1905–1956), Anglican cleric in Africa
John Evans (archdeacon of Llandaff) (died 1749)
John Evans (archdeacon of Italy) (1919–1988), Archdeacon of Malta
John Evans (archdeacon of Surrey) (1915–1996), Anglican priest
John Silas Evans, Welsh astronomer and priest

Other
John Evans (explorer) (1770–1799), Welsh explorer of the Missouri River
John Evans (pirate) (died 1723), Welsh pirate
John Evans (printer) (1774–1828), English printer
John Evans (Royal Navy officer) (1717–1794)
John Evans (surgeon) (1756–1846), Welsh
John D. Evans, American business executive and philanthropist
John Grimley Evans (1936–2018), British gerontologist
John Henry Evans (1872–1947), American Mormon educator and writer
John Louis Evans (1950–1983), American convicted murderer
John Maxwell Evans (born 1942), Canadian judge
John Morton Evans (1871–1956), British philatelist
John R. Evans Jr., United States Army general
John Evans (1877–1990), Welsh supercentenarian, see list of British supercentenarians

See also 
Jack Evans (disambiguation)
Jonathan Evans (disambiguation)
John Evans House (disambiguation)
John William Evans (disambiguation)